Grand Duke George Mikhailovich of Russia (23 August 1863 – 28 January 1919) was a Grand Duke of Russia, first cousin of Emperor Alexander III of Russia and a General in the Russian army. 
Born in Tbilisi while his father was the Governor-General of Russian provinces of Transcaucasia, he was the second surviving son of Grand Duke Michael Nicolaievich of Russia and Princess Cecilie of Baden. His paternal grandparents were Emperor Nicholas I of Russia and Princess Charlotte of Prussia. His maternal grandparents were Grand Duke Leopold I of Baden and Princess Sophie of Sweden. 

On 29 January 1919, George was moved to Peter and Paul Fortress in Petrograd, and in the early hours of the following day he was shot there by a firing squad, along with his brother, Grand Duke Nicholas Mikhailovich, and his cousins Grand Dukes Paul Alexandrovich and Dmitri Constantinovich.

Family
On 30 April 1900 at Corfu, Grand Duke George married Princess Maria, daughter of King George I of the Hellenes and Grand Duchess Olga Constantinovna of Russia.

Grand Duke George Mikhailovich and his wife Grand Duchess Maria Georgievna had two daughters:
 Princess Nina Georgievna of Russia (20 June 1901 – 27 February 1974); married in 1922 Prince Paul Chavchavadze, with whom she had one son, Prince David Chavchavadze.
 Princess Xenia Georgievna of Russia (22 August 1903 – 17 September 1965); married, firstly, in 1921, William Bateman Leeds, Jr., son of Princess Anastasia of Greece and Denmark; they divorced in 1930. Married, secondly, in 1946, Herman Jud. Xenia's only daughter, Nancy Leeds (1925–2006), married Edward Judson Wynkoop, Jr.

Honours and awards
The Grand Duke received several Russian and foreign decorations:
Russian
Knight of the Order of St. Andrew
Knight of the Order of Saint Alexander Nevsky
Knight of the Order of St. Anna, 1st Class
Knight of the Order of Saint Stanislaus, 1st Class
Knight of the Order of the White Eagle

Foreign
: Grand Cross of the Württemberg Crown, 1880
: Grand Cross of the Ludwig Order, 15 June 1884
 Kingdom of Prussia: Knight of the Order of the Black Eagle, 16 September 1884
   Austria-Hungary: Grand Cross of the Royal Hungarian Order of Saint Stephen, 1884
:
Knight of the House Order of Fidelity, 1885
Knight of the Order of Berthold the First, 1885
: Knight of the Order of the Elephant, 7 September 1900
: Knight of the Order of the Most Holy Annunciation, 13 July 1902 – during a visit to Russia of King Victor Emmanuel III of Italy
: Grand Cross of the Order of Prince Danilo I

See also
Grand Duke George Mikhailovich of Russia

Ancestry

Notes

Bibliography

Alexander, Grand Duke of Russia. Once a Grand Duke. Cassell, London, 1932, ASIN: B000J3ZFL2 
Chavchavadze, David. The Grand Dukes, Atlantic, 1989, 
Cockfield, Jamie H. White Crow: The Life and Times of the Grand Duke Nicholas Mikhailovich Romanov 1859–1919. Praeger, 2002, 
Marie Georgievna, Grand Duchess of Russia. A Romanov Diary: the Autobiography of the Grand Duchess Marie Georgievna of Russia. Gilbert's Books, 2012. 
 King, Greg and Wilson, Penny.  Gilded Prism: The Konstantinovichi Grand Dukes and the Last Years of the Romanov Dynasty . Eurohistory, 2006. 

1863 births
1919 deaths
People from Kvemo Kartli
People from Tiflis Governorate
Romanov, George Mikhailovich
House of Holstein-Gottorp-Romanov
Russian military personnel of World War I
19th-century people from the Russian Empire
Murdered Russian royalty
Victims of Red Terror in Soviet Russia
Executed Russian people
Executed people from Georgia (country)
People executed by Russia by firing squad
Grand Crosses of the Order of Saint Stephen of Hungary
Executed royalty
Prisoners of the Peter and Paul Fortress
Burials in Saint Petersburg